LuLu Mall, Kochi is a shopping mall located in Edappally, Kochi, Kerala. It contains nearly 300 outlets, including food courts, restaurants, family entertainment zones, a multiplex, ice skating rink, gaming arena, beauty parlors, a toy train joy ride and bowling alley. The mall was opened in March 2013 by then Chief Minister of Kerala, Shri Oommen Chandy.

The entire project, consisting of the shopping mall with four customized shopping levels and a 5-star hotel, was designed by the UK based architectural firm Atkins. The construction contract of the project was awarded to Shapoorji Pallonji, an Indian conglomerate. The 5-star business hotel located within the campus of the mall is operated by Marriott Hotels & Resorts.

With an average daily footfall of more than 80,000, it is one of the most visited places in Kerala. By 2021, eight years from the opening, LuLu Mall Kochi has been visited by 150 million people and had witnessed the entry of 2 million vehicles. The property is owned and managed by Abu Dhabi based LuLu Group International. The shops and restaurants in LuLu Mall are franchised via Lulu Group’s own retail operations company called Tablez. The head office building of Lulu group in India is located adjacent to the mall and hotel campus.

Location

LuLu Mall is at Edappally Junction, in the city of Kochi, at the junction of two national highways, NH 544 (previously known as NH 47) and NH 66 (previously known as NH 17).

Transport 
 Direct walkway connects the mall with the Edapally station of Kochi metro
 All city transport buses has a stopover at nearest Edapally bus stop.
 Vyttila Mobility Hub,  South
 Ernakulam Town railway station,  South
 Ernakulam Junction railway station,  South
 Aluva railway station,  North
 Cochin International Airport,  North

Features and facilities
Funtura Leisure zone which includes Ice Skating Rink, VR Zone, 5D Cinema, Amusement arcade, Rides, Party hall, 12-lane Bowling alley, Climbing wall
  ice skating rink (South India's largest)
 , nine screen PVR Cinemas multiplex with Gold class and 4DX screens
 LuLu Hypermarket, on the ground floor, one of the largest hypermarkets in the country.
 Other anchors stores such as Lulu Fashion Store, Lulu Connect, Lulu Celebrate, Marks & Spencer and Westside
 Adjacent to the mall is Kochi Marriott. The 273 room 5-star hotel stands at a height of 84 meters and has a helipad.
 2,500-seater food court that has 22 multi-cuisine kitchens and 5 restaurants
 Parking space that can accommodate 3000 cars
 Money exchange centres
 Large glass central atrium with translucent roof
 Skywalk connecting the mall with the Edapally station of Kochi metro
 A toy train that takes children across the mall floor

Mall hours and contact
General Timings (Monday to Sunday) - 10.00 AM to 10:00 PM
Lulu Hypermarket & Cinema (Monday to Sunday) - 09.00 AM to 11.00 PM
Food (Monday to Sunday) - 10.00 AM to 11.00 PM

Customer service: +91 4842727776
Customer Service: +91 4842727794
Email: lulukochi@luluindia.com

See also
Lulu International Shopping Mall, Thiruvananthapuram
Oberon Mall
Centre Square Mall, Kochi
Gold Souk Grande, Kochi
Abad Nucleus Mall
Forum Thomsun Mall

References

External links

 LuLu Shopping Mall

Shopping malls in Kochi
2013 establishments in Kerala
Shopping malls established in 2013
Ice rinks
Tourist attractions in Kochi
Tourist attractions in Ernakulam district